Qassimiut (old spellings: Qagssimiut and Kagsimiut) is a settlement in the Kujalleq municipality in southern Greenland. The settlement was founded in 1835 as a trading station. With a population of 20 in 2020, it is the smallest organized, permanent settlement in Greenland.

Until January 2009, the settlement—along Eqalugaarsuit and Saarloq, as well as 13 sheep farms—belonged to Qaqortoq municipality. On January 1, 2009, the settlement became part of Kujalleq municipality, when the Narsaq, Qaqortoq, and Nanortalik municipalities ceased to exist. The settlements are presently governed by a joint settlement council, although Qassimiut has no direct representation in the council.

Healthcare and infrastructure 

The healthcare services for the settlement are provided by the Napparsimavik Hospital in Qaqortoq. The hospital boat regularly visits the settlement, and an emergency helicopter is available if needed.

KNI subsidiary Pilersuisoq operates a local, all-purpose general store in the settlement.

Settlement school 
The settlement school--Atuarfik Qassimiut, Greenlandic for "school of Qassimiut" is part of the Qaqortoq education district. The two-classroom school building was moved to Qassimiut in 1965. The most recent refurbishing and renovation of the school was in the late 1980s.

Transport and communications 

The settlement has its own heliport, Qassimiut Heliport, which is operated by Mittarfeqarfiit. All other transportation is by boat only. The settlement has gravel roads, but there are no cars.

Internet and phone communications are provided by Greenland Home Rule.

Famous people from Qassimiut 
 Jonathan Motzfeldt – politician (S)

Population 
Most towns and settlements in southern Greenland exhibit negative growth patterns over the last two decades, with many settlements rapidly depopulating. Qassimiut has been rapidly losing population over the last two decades. Its population has decreased by more than two thirds relative to the 1990 levels.

References

Populated places in Greenland